EWR-Arena (called Wormatia-Stadion until 2011) is a multi-use stadium in Worms, Germany.  It is currently used mostly for football matches and is the home of Wormatia Worms.  The stadium has a capacity of 5,724 people. It opened in 1927 and was renovated in 2008 when Wormatia Worms were promoted into Regionalliga Süd.

External links
Venue information

Football venues in Germany
Wormatia Worms
Worms, Germany
Sports venues in Rhineland-Palatinate